Sirpur may refer to the following communities:

Chhattisgarh, India
 Sirpur, Durg, a village in Dondiluhara tehsil, Durg district
 Sirpur, Kanker, a village in Pakhanjore tehsil, Kanker district
 Sirpur, Kondagaon, a village in Kondagaon tehsil, Bastar district
 Sirpur, Narayanpur, a village in Narayanpur tehsil, Bastar district
 Sirpur, Mahasamund, a village in Mahasamund tehsil, Mahasamund district
 Sirpur, Saraipali, a village in Saraipali tehsil, Mahasamund district

Telangana, India
 Sirpur (T), a town in Sirpur (T) mandal, Komaram Bheem district
 Sirpur (U), a village in Sirpur (U) mandal, Komaram Bheem district

See also
 Sirpur Dam, a dam on Bagh river in Chhattisgarh and Maharashtra, India
 Sirpur Group of Monuments, an archaeological site around Mahanadi river in Chhattisgarh, India
 Sirpur Paper Mills, a paper mill in Telangana, India